The men's coxed fours with inriggers, also referred to as the coxed four with jugriggers, was a rowing event held as part of the Rowing at the 1912 Summer Olympics programme. It was the only appearance of the restricted event. The competition was held on Wednesday and Thursday, 17 and 18 July 1912. Thirty rowers from four nations competed.

Starting list

The following boats and/or rowing clubs participated:

 Nykjøbings paa Falster Roklub
 Société Nautique de Bayonne
 Christiania Roklub
 Ormsund Roklub
 Göteborgs Roddförening
 Roddklubben af 1912

Results

Quarterfinals

All quarterfinals were held on Wednesday, 17 July 1912.

Quarterfinal 1: 11 a.m. Both boats got well away, the Norwegians leading for the first hundred metres or so. Then the Swedish, who were rowing a somewhat quicker stroke, began to creep up, and soon passed their opponents, obtaining a lead which they retained for the rest of the race. The winning crew pulling from 32–38 a minute, the Norwegian stroke varying between 28 and 38. Both boats were very well rowed, and it was physical strength that gave Sweden the victory.

Quarterfinal 2: 11.20 a.m. At the start, Sweden led with an energetic stroke of 36, while the Danes rowed a longer but very effective stroke, which they used to perfection. The forward half of the stroke was one of extraordinary length, with a fine finish and excellent carriage of the hands. The way the crew rowed like one man was beyond all praise, and the four showed that it fully deserved its great reputation. The Swedish crew also made a very good impression and was only a little worse than its Danish rival; most noteworthy, perhaps, was the energetic stubbornness with which the Swedes defended the lead they succeeded in gaining at the start. The Danish crew was in better training, however, and the Swedes were not able to maintain their position when the Danes – who had the inner curve at the bath-house – began their spurt. Surely and irresistibly the Danish boat came up to, and passed, the Swedish, which, although at Djurgård Bridge, it had the advantage of the inner curve, could make no use of its position, but was beaten by one and a half length.

Quarterfinal 3: 11.40 a.m. The two crews kept side by side for only 100 metres, the Norwegians then taking the lead and keeping it, without once being challenged by their rivals.

Semifinals

Both semifinals were also held on Wednesday, 17 July.

Semifinal 1: 5.40 p.m. The Norwegians at once took the lead, which they kept for the first of the course, rowing 32–36 to the 34 of the Swedes. Halfway, the Swedish boat crept up to ist rival and, from the bath-house to the post, there was a most desperate struggle for victory, which was decided in favour of the home-crew by an energetic spurt at the last moment.

Semifinal 2: 6 p.m. The crew rowed over in beautiful style, but without opponent.

Final

The final was held on Thursday, 18 July.

Final: 7.30 p.m. Both crews rowed nicely and evenly, keeping side by side, until the 1,000 metres mark was reached, when the Danish crew, exhibiting perfect style and great physical power, began to take the lead. The Swedish crew was somewhat handicapped by the circumstance that some of the men had taken part in a punishing race against New College in the men's eight competition the same day, and Carl Møller was not at all in form, owing to a bad boil on one of his legs. Consequently, they had little hope of winning when, before the bridge was reached, the Danes began a final spurt, which gave them the race by a clear length. The Danish crew can be taken as the model of perfect rowing in inriggers, and its well-deserved victory was greeted by everyone – not least by its Swedish opponents – with hearty cheers.

References

Sources
 
 

Rowing at the 1912 Summer Olympics